"The King of the Golden Mountain" is a German fairy tale collected by the Brothers Grimm in Grimm's Fairy Tales (KHM 92).

The tale is of Aarne-Thompson type 401A ("The Enchanted Princess in Her Castle"), with an introduction of type 810 ("The Devil Loses a Soul That Was Promised Him"), and other episodes of type 560 ("The Magic Ring") and of type 518, ("Quarreling Giants Lose Their Magic Objects").

The main version anthologized was taken down from a soldier; there is also a variant collected from Zwehrn whose storyline summarized by Grimm in his notes.

Synopsis

A merchant with a young son and daughter lost everything except a field.  Walking in that field, he met a black mannikin (dwarf) who promised to make him rich if, in twelve years, he brought the first thing that rubbed against his leg when he went home.  The merchant agreed.  When he got home, his boy rubbed against his leg.  He went to the attic and found money, but when the twelve years were up, he grew sad.  His son got the story from him and assured him that the black man had no power over him.  The son had himself blessed by the priest and went to argue with the black man.  Finally, the mannikin agreed that the boy could be put in a boat and shoved off into the water.

The boat carried him to another shore.  A snake met him, but was a transformed princess.  She told him if for three nights he let twelve black men beat him, she would be freed.  He agreed and did it, and she married him, making him the King of the Golden Mountain, and in time bore him a son.  When the boy was seven, the king wanted to see his own parents.  His wife thought it would bring evil, but gave him a ring that would wish him to his parents and back again, telling him must not wish her to come with him.  He went, but to get in the town, he had to put off his fine and magnificent clothing for a shepherd's; once inside, first he had to persuade his parents that he was their son, and then he could not persuade him that he was a king.  Frustrated, he wished his wife and son with him.  When he slept, his wife took the ring and wished herself and their son back to the Golden Mountain.

He walked until he found three giants quarreling over their inheritance:  a sword that would cut off all heads but the owner's, if ordered to; a cloak of invisibility; and boots that would carry the wearer anywhere.  He said he had to try them first, and with them, went back to the Golden Mountain, where his wife was about to marry another man. But at the banquet she was unable to enjoy any of the food or wine because the hero would invisibly take them away and consume them. The dismayed queen ran to her chamber, whereupon the hero revealed himself to her, rebuking her betrayal. Now addressing himself to the guests in the hall, he declared the wedding called off, as he was the rightful ruler, asking the guests to leave. As they refused to do this, and tried to seize him, the hero invoked the command to his magic sword, and all other heads rolled off. He had now again assumed his place as King of the Golden Mountain.

See also

The Girl Without Hands
The Beautiful Palace East of the Sun and North of the Earth
The Blue Mountains
The Three Princesses of Whiteland

Explanatory notes

References

Bibliography

External links

 

King of the Golden Mountain
Golden Mountain
ATU 400-459
ATU 750-849